John Pleydell (c. 1535 – 1608) was the member of Parliament for Cricklade in the parliament of 1593.

Pleydell was a younger son of a wealthy tenant farmer William Pleydell of Coleshill, Berkshire—now Oxfordshire—and Agnes Reason (daughter of Robert Reason of Corfe Castle, Dorset). He was a younger  brother of Gabriel.

References 

Members of Parliament for Cricklade
English MPs 1593
1530s births
1608 deaths
Year of birth unknown
People from Wiltshire
People from Vale of White Horse (district)
People of the Elizabethan era
John